Spur 342 is a state highway spur route located completely within the city of Galveston, Texas.

Route description
Spur 342 begins at an intersection with Seawall Boulevard on the Galveston Seawall in Galveston, Galveston County, heading north-northwest on 61st Street, a six-lane divided highway. From here, FM 3005 heads west on Seawall Boulevard. Spur 342 heads through commercial resort areas with some residences. After passing more businesses, the highway crosses Offats Bayou. A short distance later, Spur 342 comes to its northern terminus at an interchange with I-45 in a commercial area.

History
Spur 342 was designated onto its current alignment on September 26, 1960. It has remained there since.

Major intersections

References 

342
Transportation in Galveston, Texas
Transportation in Galveston County, Texas